Mauro F. Guillén (born 1964) is a Spanish/American sociologist, political economist, management educator. In March 2021 he was announced as the new Director (Dean) of the Cambridge Judge Business School, and a Fellow of Queens' College at the University of Cambridge before resigning in 2023 to return to his family and his professorship at Wharton. Until July 2021, he was the Zandman Professor at the Wharton School of the University of Pennsylvania, and Director of the Penn Lauder Center for International Business Education and Research (CIBER). He was the Anthony L. Davis Director of the Joseph H. Lauder Institute of Management and International Studies from 2007 to 2019. He is the Wall Street Journal bestselling author of 2030: How Today's Biggest Trends Will Collide and Reshape the Future of Everything (2020).

Biography

Education 
Guillén graduated in 1987 from the University of Oviedo in his native Spain with a BA degree in Political Economy and Business Management. He went to the United States in 1987 to pursue a PhD in Sociology, sponsored by the Bank of Spain and the Fulbright Program. He graduated from Yale University in 1992.

During his time at Yale, he also completed the requirements for the doctoral program in Political Economy at the University of Oviedo, which awarded him a Doctorate in 1991 after defending a thesis on health inequalities in Spain. At Yale, he wrote his dissertation under the direction of sociologists Charles Perrow, Paul DiMaggio, and Juan J. Linz, which later became his book, Models of Management (University of Chicago Press, 1994).

His professors Jesús M. de Miguel and Alvaro Cuervo were his earliest intellectual mentors. Aside from his advisors, he considers the cultural anthropologist Clifford Geertz and the political economist Albert Hirschman to be his most important intellectual influences, whom he met while a member at the Institute for Advanced Study in Princeton University.

Career 
His first faculty appointment was at the Sloan School of Management, Massachusetts Institute of Technology, where he taught between 1992 and 1996. He moved to the Wharton School in 1996 following his wife, Sandra Suárez, who took that year a faculty position at Temple University. At the Wharton School, Guillén was promoted from assistant to associate professor with tenure in 2000, and from associate professor to full professor in 2003. He was appointed as Dr. Felix Zandman Endowed Professor in International Management that same year, a chair established in honor of the chemist who founded the Fortune 500 semiconductor company Vishay Intertechnology. He was certified by the Spanish Education Ministry as a Full Professor (Catedrático) in 2010.

Guillén is an Elected Fellow of the Sociological Research Association and of the Macro Organizational Behavior Society, a former Guggenheim Fellow, and a Member in the Institute for Advanced Study in Princeton. In 2005 he won the IV Fundación Banco Herrero Prize, awarded annually to the best Spanish social scientist under the age of 40. In 2013 he received the Aspen Institute's Faculty Pioneer Award. He delivered the 2014 Clarendon Lectures in Management at Oxford University.

At Wharton, Guillén teaches undergraduates, MBAs, PhD students, and executives. He has received a Wharton MBA Core Teaching Award, a Wharton Graduate Association Teaching Award, a Wharton Teaching Commitment and Curricular Innovation Award, and a Wharton “Goes Above and Beyond the Call of Duty” Teaching Award. As the Anthony L. Davis Director of the Joseph H. Lauder Institute of Management and International Studies, he launched many programs and initiatives, including the Global Knowledge Lab, the TrendLab on Globalization, the Lauder Culture Quest, the Global Program, and the Lauder Entrepreneurship Modules.

Other activities 
His professional activities include being, or having been, Vice-Chair of the Global Agenda Council on Emerging Multinationals at the World Economic Forum, trustee of the Madrid Institute of Advanced Study in the Social Sciences, and member of the advisory boards of the research department of Caixabank, Conciban, and the Escuela de Finanzas Applicadas (Grupo Analistas). He also serves or has served on the editorial boards of over ten scholarly journals, and as Associate Editor of the Administrative Science Quarterly. He is a member of the Jury for the Princess of Asturias International Prize for the Social Sciences. Since 2015 he has served as trustee of the Fundación Princesa de Asturias.

An avid traveler, Guillén’s hobbies include history and architecture. In 2006 Princeton University Press published his book, The Taylorized Beauty of the Mechanical, which explored the connections between scientific management and modernist architecture between 1890 and 1940 in various parts of the world. He was a member of the University of Oviedo team that won the Spain National Basketball University Championship in 1987, and of Club Baloncesto Elosúa León from 1980 to 1983.

Work 
Mauro Guillén is best known for his comparative studies of companies and management practices in a variety of countries, especially in Western Europe, Latin America, and East Asia. More recently, he has devoted most of his research and teaching to the topics of globalization and the rise of the emerging-market multinationals.

At the present time, Guillén is engaged in research on the new political economy of the twenty-first century, and on the rise of multinational firms from emerging economies. He is the co-author of two recent books, one on Global Turning Points: Understanding the Challenges for Business in the Twenty-First Century, with Emilio Ontiveros (Cambridge University Press), and the other on Emerging Markets Rule: Growth Strategies of the New Global Giants, with Esteban García-Canal (McGraw-Hill).

He is the author of a dozen books and over 30 scholarly articles, published by the most prestigious university presses and competitive scholarly journals. He is also a consultant and frequent public speaker, and appears regularly in TV and radio programs.

His books and articles have earned Guillén the Gulf Publishing Company Best Paper Award of the Academy of Management, the W. Richard Scott Best Paper Award of the American Sociological Association, the Gustavus Myers Center Award for Outstanding Book on Human Rights, and the President’s Book Award of the Social Science History Association. He was identified in 2009 by Science Watch as being among the top one percent of scholars in the fields of Economics & Business, and Social Sciences.  He has received fellowships from the Fundación Rafael del Pino, the John Simon Guggenheim Memorial Foundation, the Marion and Jasper Whiting Foundation, and the Fulbright/Spanish Ministry of Education program.

Guillén is a frequent commentator on Bloomberg TV and National Public Radio, and has also appeared on BBC Radio, CNBC, ABC Action News, CNN en español, and CBS News Radio.  He writes a monthly op-ed column for The Korea Times on global economic issues (co-authored with Emilio Ontiveros). He has also published articles in the China Daily, Financial Times, Chronicle of Higher Education, and El País, among other newspapers.  He has been quoted in over 100 media outlets, including the Boston Globe, Chicago Tribune, Economist Intelligence Unit Executive Briefing, Entrepreneur Magazine, Financial Times, Forbes, Foreign Policy, Los Angeles Times, New York Newsday, Newsweek, New York Times, Investor’s Business Daily, International Herald Tribune, Journal of Commerce, The Economist, USA Today, Wall Street Journal, Wall Street Journal Europe, Wall Street Journal Americas, Washington Times, and World Trade.

Selected publications 
 Guillén, Mauro F. Models of management: Work, authority, and organization in a comparative perspective. University of Chicago Press, 1994.
 Guillén, Mauro F. Symbolic Unity, Dynastic Continuity, and Countervailing Power: Monarchies, Republics, and the Economy.  Social Forces, soy037. 2018.

Articles, a selection:
 Guillen, Mauro F. "Business groups in emerging economies: A resource-based view." Academy of Management Journal 43.3 (2000): 362-380.
 Guillén, Mauro F. "Is globalization civilizing, destructive or feeble? A critique of five key debates in the social science literature." Annual Review of Sociology (2001): 235-260.
 Schneper, William D., and Mauro F. Guillén. "Stakeholder rights and corporate governance: A cross-national study of hostile takeovers." Administrative Science Quarterly 49.2 (2004): 263-295.
 Henisz, Witold J., Bennet A. Zelner, and Mauro F. Guillén. "The worldwide diffusion of market-oriented infrastructure reform, 1977–1999." American Sociological Review 70.6 (2005): 871-897.

References

External links 
 Mauro Guillén at wharton.upenn.edu.

1964 births
Living people
Spanish sociologists
Spanish political scientists
University of Oviedo alumni
Yale University alumni